Christian Cantwell (born September 30, 1980 in Jefferson City, Missouri) is a World Champion American shot putter. He placed 4th at the 2012 London Summer Olympics.

Biography
Cantwell's personal best throw is 22.54 metres, or 73 ft 11½ in, set in Gresham, Oregon on June 5, 2004.  His best outdoor season to date was 2006, in which he had 8 of the 10 longest throws in the  year. He was born in Jefferson City, Missouri and attended Eldon High School in Eldon. He graduated in 1999. In 2003, he attended the University of Missouri. He won a silver medal in 2008 Summer Olympics at Beijing, China on August 15, 2008 with his final throw of 21.09 metres, the gold winner was Tomasz Majewski of Poland. At the Berlin World Championships in 2009, their positions were reversed as Cantwell took gold with a throw of 22.03 metres.  He won the gold medal at the 2010 World Indoor Championships.  At the 2011 World Championships, he took bronze with a throw of 21.36.

Personal
He married USA Olympian Shot putter Teri Steer. They have one child, Jackson Daniel Cantwell born in 2008.

References

External links
 
 
 
 
 

1980 births
Living people
Sportspeople from Jefferson City, Missouri
Track and field athletes from Missouri
American male shot putters
University of Missouri alumni
Athletes (track and field) at the 2008 Summer Olympics
Athletes (track and field) at the 2012 Summer Olympics
Olympic silver medalists for the United States in track and field
World Athletics Championships medalists
Medalists at the 2008 Summer Olympics
World Athletics Championships athletes for the United States
Diamond League winners
USA Outdoor Track and Field Championships winners
USA Indoor Track and Field Championships winners
World Athletics Indoor Championships winners
IAAF Continental Cup winners
World Athletics Championships winners
IAAF World Athletics Final winners